Return to the Last Chance Saloon is the second studio album by English rock band The Bluetones, released on 9 March 1998. The album is currently certified Gold by the BPI. Its offspring singles were "Solomon Bites the Worm", "If...", "Sleazy Bed Track" and "4-Day Weekend".

Track listing
All tracks written by: Chesters, Devlin, Morriss, Morriss:
  "Tone Blooze" – 2:27
  "Unpainted Arizona" – 3:09   
  "Solomon Bites the Worm" – 3:09
  "U.T.A." – 4:04
  "4-Day Weekend" – 3:57
  "Sleazy Bed Track" – 4:41
  "If..." – 5:12
  "The Jub-Jub Bird" – 4:26
  "Sky Will Fall" – 3:16
  "Ames" – 4:44
  "Down at the Reservoir" – 3:19
  "Heard You Were Dead" – 4:04
  "Broken Starr" – 15:49 (track finishes at 5:56 and between this time and 13:04 it is silent)
  "A Woman Done Gone Left Me" (hidden track) the track starts at 13:04 then continues to the end of the 15:49 track

References

1998 albums
The Bluetones albums
Albums produced by Hugh Jones (producer)